Na Corda Bamba (English: On Thin Ice) is a Portuguese telenovela broadcast and produced by TVI. It is written by Rui Vilhena. The telenovela premiered on September 15, 2019 and ended on May 15, 2020. It is recorded between Lisbon and Madeira.

Plot 
Desiring the impossible is a dangerous feeling. The path is something mandatory, you have to fight. Despair leads us through fatal shortcuts. But, what if the only way to achieve our dreams is to commit a crime? Would we be able to do it? Like any criminal, Lucia and Pipo believe they have committed the perfect crime. For a long time, they think they are living the dream of a happy family with their three kids until death comes to life. The family album hides ghosts that no one imagines. Sometimes, when you want to erase a crime, you need to commit one. Welcome to the Lobo family.

Cast

Series overview

Awards and nominations

References

External links

Portuguese telenovelas
Televisão Independente telenovelas
2019 Portuguese television series debuts
2020 Portuguese television series endings
2019 telenovelas
Portuguese-language telenovelas